Shahrulnizam Yusof (born 15 February 1990) is a Malaysian cricketer. He played in the 2014 ICC World Cricket League Division Three tournament.

References

External links
 

1990 births
Living people
Malaysian cricketers
People from Pahang
Cricketers at the 2010 Asian Games
Cricketers at the 2014 Asian Games
Asian Games competitors for Malaysia